Sania Mirza and Barbora Strýcová were the defending champions, but chose not to participate together. Mirza played alongside Peng Shuai, but lost in the semifinals to Hsieh Su-wei and Monica Niculescu. Strýcová teamed up with Lucie Šafářová, but lost in the semifinals to Chan Yung-jan and Martina Hingis.

Chan and Hingis went on to win the title, defeating Hsieh and Niculescu in the final, 4–6, 6–4, [10–7].
 
As a result of Bethanie Mattek-Sands' absence due to injury, Šafářová attained the WTA no. 1 doubles ranking at the end of the tournament after reaching the semifinals with Strýcová.

Seeds
All seeds received a bye into the second round.

Draw

Finals

Top half

Bottom half

External links
 Main draw

Women's Doubles